Sepideh Rashnu (born 1994) is an Iranian writer, who is imprisoned for protesting against state-imposed hijab rules. In July 2022, she had an altercation on a public bus with another woman over the hijab rules, and the video went viral on social media.

History 
Sepideh Rashnu was arrested on 16 July 2022, after a video of an altercation between Rashnu and another woman on a bus went viral. The altercation happened between Rashnu and Rayeheh Rabii, a woman who was trying to enforce the Iranian government's compulsory hijab policy in public, and who according to Rabii was not wearing her hijab "properly". It is also said that Rashnu was assaulted during the altercation.

Later in July 2022, the state-run television, IRIB, played a video of Rashnu's confessions, which is said to have been recorded under duress. It has also been reported that a few days prior to the confession's recording she has been to a hospital in Tehran, because of internal bleeding, possibly because of torture.

She was released from Evin Prison on 30 August 2022 by providing 8'000'000'000 IRR (approximately USD $29,000) as collateral.

See also 
 2017–2019 Iranian protests against compulsory hijab
 Compulsory Hijab in Iran
 Forced confession

References

External links 
 Sepideh Rashnu on United States Commission on International Religious Freedom's victim database.
 

1994 births
Living people
Iranian prisoners and detainees
Iranian women journalists